Pihla-Kaibaldi Nature Reserve is a nature reserve situated on Hiiumaa in western Estonia, in Hiiu County.

The nature reserve protects a variety of landscape types, like forested sand dunes, several different types of bogs and swamp woods. Estonia's largest area of loose sand is located in the reserve. The nature reserve is an important habitat for several threatened species, e.g. Bog Orchid, Fly Orchid and Brown Beak-Sedge.

References

Nature reserves in Estonia
Hiiumaa Parish
Forests of Estonia
Wetlands of Estonia
Landforms of Hiiu County
Geography of Hiiu County